3K Battery is a brand of automotive and motorcycle batteries in Thailand and other international markets.  The products are marketed by Thai Storage Battery Public Company Limited (ABBV: TSB), which manufactures and distributes these batteries.  TSB was established on 10 June 1986.

The company recently delayed a major investment in Thailand due to investor pressures. The company's shares (BAT-3K) are traded on the Stock Exchange of Thailand (SET).

The company closed in mid-2017 due to the heavy losses.

References

External links
 Company Website

Auto parts suppliers of Thailand
Thai brands
Manufacturing companies established in 1986
Manufacturing companies disestablished in 2017
2017 disestablishments in Thailand
Thai companies established in 1986